Finland competed at the 2016 Winter Youth Olympics in Lillehammer, Norway from 12 to 21 February 2016.

Medalists

Alpine skiing

Boys

Girls

Parallel mixed team

Biathlon

Boys

Girls

Mixed

Cross-country skiing

Boys

Girls

Figure skating

Singles

Mixed NOC team trophy

Freestyle skiing

Ski cross

Slopestyle

Ice hockey

Boys' tournament 

Roster

 Tobias Akerman
 Justus Annunen
 Konsta Hirvonen
 Jesperi Kotkaniemi
 Miska Kukkonen
 Rasmus Kupari
 Eetu Maki
 Kalle Matikainen
 Jesse Moilanen
 Arttu Nevasaari
 Niklas Nordgren
 Jasper Rannisto
 Uula Ruikka
 Santeri Salmela
 Samuel Salonen
 Toni Utunen
 Jimi Uusitalo

Group Stage

Semifinals

Bronze medal game

Nordic combined

Ski jumping

Snowboarding

Halfpipe

Slopestyle

Snowboard and ski cross relay

Qualification legend: FA – Qualify to medal round; FB – Qualify to consolation round

Speed skating

Boys

Mixed team sprint

See also
Finland at the 2016 Summer Olympics

References

2016 in Finnish sport
Nations at the 2016 Winter Youth Olympics
Finland at the Youth Olympics